Garry Higgins (born 15 June 1955) is a former Australian rules footballer who played with Carlton in the Victorian Football League (VFL).

Notes

External links 

Garry Higgins's profile at Blueseum

1955 births
Carlton Football Club players
Maryborough Football Club players
Australian rules footballers from Victoria (Australia)
Living people